NMR-STAR is an extension of the STAR file format to store the results of biological NMR experiments.

Chemical file formats